Direct Selling Europe (DSE) is a federation of trade associations founded in 2007 to represent the interests of the European direct selling industry in the European Union. It was founded by national direct selling associations from Austria, Belgium, Germany and Switzerland, and 10 European-based direct selling companies (AMC International AG, Déesse AG, Eismann, inmediaOne, Just International AG, Lux International AG, Pierre Lang Europe, Tupperware Brands Corporation, Vorwerk & Co AG, and WIV International AG). 

Since then, four other companies joined DSE, including Avon Products.

Members

Associations
 Direct Selling Association of Germany
 Professional Association of Direct Selling of Belgium
 Swiss Direct Selling Association
 Austrian Direct Selling Association
 Italian Direct Selling Association

Companies
AMC International
Avon Products
Déesse AG
JAFRA Cosmetics
Just International AG
Lux International AG
Nutrimetics
Tupperware Brands Corporation
Victoria Benelux
Vorwerk & Co AG
WIV International AG

References

External links
Official website

Direct selling
Retail trade associations
International organisations based in Belgium